This is a list of past and current municipal poets laureate serving towns, counties, and cities in Massachusetts. The state of Massachusetts does not have a poet laureate program.

Arlington
 Miriam Levine - 2015

Boston
 Samuel James Cornish
 Danielle Legros Georges - 2014
 Porsha Olayiwola - 2019

Martha's Vineyard

 Lee H. McCormack - 2012-2014
 Arnie Reisman - 2014-2016

New Bedford
 Everett Hoagland - 1994-1998
 John Landry - 2007
 Patricia Gomes - 2014-2021
 Sarah Mulvey - 2022

Northampton
 Janet Aalfs - 2003-2005
 Patrick Donnelly - 2015-2017

References

Massachusetts
Poets from Massachusetts
Lists of poets